EIFA International School, formerly known as L'Ecole Internationale Franco-Anglaise, is an English-French international co-educational nursery, junior  and senior independent day school, located in Marylebone, London.

EIFA is a school for children aged 24 months to 18 years old, from Early childhood to Key Stage 5.  Its curriculum is accredited by the Mission Laïque Française and the French National Ministry of Education and it is overseen by the French Ministry of Foreign Affairs.  EIFA is inspected by OFSTED and the French Inspecteur des Ecoles du Ministère de l’Education Nationale. EIFA prepares its pupils for the IGCSE, the French Brevet (DNB) and the International Baccalaurate® (IB) Exams.

EIFA has two locations situated in Central London, catering for local and international families.  There is one school building on Portland Place, London and one on Duchess Street, London, all located in Marylebone.

History 
EIFA opened its doors in January 2013 in a temporary building situated at 55 Harley Street, London.  Its first pupil intake was 23 children from Nursery to Year 6.  The school then moved in May 2013 into its current building at 36 Portland Place, London.  By September 2013, the school grew to 130 pupils.  In September 2015, EIFA expanded its offering to a Senior School from Year 7 to Year 11, then housed again in a temporary building at 126 Harley Street, London.  The Senior School was then moved in April 2016 to its current premises in Duchess House.  With the addition of the IB Diploma Programme, the Senior School goes up to Year 13.

EIFA extended its offering to a day nursery in September 2016 and named it “Little EIFA”.  The 36 Portland Place premises is home to Little EIFA.

Curriculum 
Little EIFA is a day nursery for children aged 21 months and above.  It follows the Early Years Foundation Stage and like the rest of the school, Little EIFA is French-English bilingual.  All nursery staff, teachers and teaching assistants, are native French or English speakers.  Children learn through play in a bilingual environment and quickly become fluent in both languages.

From Nursery to Year 6, each class has two form teachers: a native qualified English teacher and a native French qualified teacher who work as a team.  They teach the French national Curriculum which is enriched with elements from the National Curriculum for England.  The combined two curricula provide a bilingual programme that marries academic rigour with cultural, artistic and humanitarian enrichment.  The language of instruction is equally dispensed in both English and French.

From Year 7 to Year 11 in Senior School, subjects are taught equally in French and English.  In Year 10, pupils can take the French Brevet exams or sit the IGCSE exams in Year 11 under the Cambridge Assessment International Education body or Edexcel.  Non-native French speaker pupils who are more proficient in French can also take the Diplôme d’Etude de la Langue Française exams (DELF).

The IB Diploma Programme is taught in Year 12 and Year 13, and pupils are able to obtain a bilingual IB diploma at the end of that two-year programme.  The IB diploma is wildly accepted by over 2,000 universities around the world.

The Brevet, IGCSE and IB diploma examinations are all externally assessed by their relevant national bodies.

In its recent 2018 inspection, EIFA was awarded “Outstanding” by OFSTED for the Personal Development, Behaviour and Welfare of its pupils and staff.

Demographics 
In 2019, EIFA counted over 310 pupils who are spread between its three premises. EIFA’s pupils and staff come from 40 different countries and there are over 30 different languages spoken at the school.

References 

Good Schools Guide
2018 OFSTED Inspection Report

External links 
Official website (www.eifaschool.com)

Educational institutions established in 2013
Private co-educational schools in London
Private schools in the City of Westminster
International Baccalaureate schools in England
International schools in England
International schools in London
2013 establishments in England